Nina-Friederike Gnädig (born 9 December 1977) is a German actress. She is best known for her performance as Anna Badosi in Stuttgart Homicide.

Selected filmography

References

External links 

1977 births
Living people
Actors from Nuremberg
German actresses